Avery Jamal Atkins (May 29, 1987 – July 5, 2007) was an American football cornerback. A highly touted prospect, he died in 2007 at the age of 20.

A native of Daytona Beach, Florida, Atkins attended Mainland High School, where he was an All-State cornerback and running back. Regarded as a four-star recruit by Rivals.com, he chose Florida over numerous offers, including Auburn, Florida State, Miami, Michigan, and South Carolina. Atkins was the highest-rated prospect in Urban Meyer's first recruiting class.

As a true freshman, Atkins started three games in the 2005 season. In the Florida–Florida State game he intercepted a pass and recovered a fumble. A projected starter, he played three games in 2006 before leaving the team.

Death
On July 5, 2007, he was found dead in his car in Port Orange, Florida. An autopsy revealed he had high levels of ecstasy in his body as well as carbon monoxide.  Police have ruled out a suicide attempt.

References

External links
Recruiting Profile at Rivals.com
Recruiting Profile at Scout.com

1987 births
2007 deaths
Sportspeople from Daytona Beach, Florida
American football cornerbacks
Florida Gators football players
Drug-related deaths in Florida
Bethune–Cookman Wildcats football players
Players of American football from Florida